Agela was an assembly of young men in Dorian Crete, who lived together from their seventeenth year till the time of their marriage. Up to the end of their sixteenth year they remained in their father's house; and from the circumstance of their belonging to no agela, they were called apageloi. They were then enrolled in agelae which were of an aristocratic nature, and gave great power to particular families. An agela consisted of the sons of the most noble citizens, who were usually under the jurisdiction of the father of the youth who had been the means of collecting the agela. It was the duty of this person, called , to superintend the military and gymnastic exercises of the youths, to accompany them to the hunting, and to punish them when disobedient. He was accountable, however, to the state, which supported the agela at the public expense. All the members of an agela were obliged to marry a woman at the same time. 

When they ceased to belong to an agela, they partook of the public meals for men andreia (Laconian syssitia). These institutions were afterwards preserved in only a few states of Crete, such for instance as Lyctus. At Sparta the youths left their parents' houses at seven years of age and entered the bouai, the Spartan equivalent for agela.

References

Ephorus, ap. Strab. x. p. 480, &c.; Heracl. Pont. c. 3.; Hock, Creta^ iii. p. 100, &c.; Muller, Dor. iv. 5. § 3; Hermann, Griech. Staatsaltertliumer, § 22; Wachsmuth, Hellen. Alterthumskunde, vol. i. p. 362, 2d ed.; Krause, Die Gymnastik u. Agonistik d. Hellenen, p. 690, &c.)

Dorian Crete
Society of ancient Greece